The legal status of Texas is the standing of Texas as a political entity. While Texas has been part of various political entities throughout its history, including 10 years during 1836–1846 as the independent Republic of Texas, the current legal status is as a state of the United States of America.

Due to Texas's unique history, United States sovereignty over Texas has been disputed at times. Adherents of secessionist movements claim that American sovereignty is illegal, although this viewpoint is not widely held. Disputes over the legal status of Texas have revolved around key issues that include, but are not limited to, the legitimacy of its re-admittance to the Union following the Civil War, differing viewpoints over its de facto and de jure international standing, and perceived discrepancies between its original and current boundaries.

Regardless, a minority viewpoint, as expressed by some factions such as Republic of Texas (group), has persisted, asserting that Texas remains an independent nation and that American actions in the American Civil War have resulted in an illegal military occupation of Texas. The debate is considered by some to resemble academic discourse being argued by several other activist groups in the United States, most notably arguments over the legal status of Hawaii and the legal status of Alaska. The situation most closely resembles that of Hawaii, as Hawaii was also annexed via a Joint Resolution of Congress.

History

Prior to the revolution that resulted in the creation of the Republic of Texas in 1836, the area now included in the State of Texas was part of Mexico.

On March 1, 1845, the US enacted a congressional joint resolution proposing the annexation of Texas to the United States (Joint Resolution for annexing Texas to the United States, J.Res. 8, enacted March 1, 1845). On June 23, 1845, the Texan Congress accepted the US Congress's joint resolution, and consented to President Jones' calling of a convention to be held on July 4, 1845. A Texas convention debated the annexation offer and almost unanimously passed an ordinance assenting to it on July 4, 1845. The convention debated through August 28, and adopted the Constitution of the State of Texas on August 27, 1845. On December 29, 1845, the United States admitted the State of Texas to the Union (Joint Resolution for the admission of the state of Texas into the Union, J.Res. 1, enacted December 29, 1845).

On February 1, 1861, a special convention in Texas adopted an ordinance of secession repealing the ordinance of annexation and seceding from the United States (by 95% vote, 166 to 8), and on February 7, the Legislature ordered a public referendum to be held on the ordinance under the direction of the convention. On February 23, 1861, citizens of Texas voted overwhelmingly to secede from the United States, by 75% as 46,153 to 14,747. During the American Civil War, Texas was invaded by Union troops many times including the final major clash of the war which was the Battle of Palmito Ranch, on May 12–13, 1865.

On June 17, 1865, President Andrew Johnson appointed Andrew Jackson Hamilton as the provisional civilian governor of the state and directed him to convene a constitutional convention restricted to loyal Americans. On March 15, 1866, the convention enacted an ordinance repealing the ordinance of secession. A referendum was held on June 25, 1866, pursuant to the laws then in force on March 29, for the ratification of the amendments proposed by the convention. In March 1867 under the More Efficient Government of the Rebel States established under the first of the Reconstruction Acts, by General Orders No. 10, Gen. Philip Sheridan was appointed military governor of the Fifth Military District.

In February 1869 the Supreme Court ruled in Texas v. White that the secession had been illegal, that the Union was insoluble by actions of a state, and that states therefore did not have the right to secede.

Historical legal actions

The political status of Texas has been questioned legally at various times subsequent to its re-admittance to the Union. Two landmark Supreme Court decisions set the prevailing precedent on the status of Texas.

Texas v. White, United States Supreme Court, (1869)
In 1869, the Supreme Court ruled that secession of Texas from the United States was illegal.  The court wrote, "The Constitution, in all its provisions, looks to an indestructible Union, composed of indestructible States."  The court did allow some possibility of the divisibility "through revolution, or through consent of the States."
DeLima v. Bidwell, 182 U.S. 1 (1901)
Annexation via a joint resolution of Congress is legal.  The Supreme Court wrote, "A treaty made by that power is said to be the supreme law of the land, as efficacious as an act of Congress; and, if subsequent and inconsistent with an act of Congress, repeals it. This must be granted, and also that one of the ordinary incidents of a treaty is the cession of territory, and that the territory thus acquired is acquired as absolutely as if the annexation were made, as in the case of Texas and Hawaii, by an act of Congress."

Recent legal actions
This section deals primarily with modern theoretical arguments regarding Texas' de jure status under certain interpretations of international law, a focal point of modern assertions regarding alternate viewpoints on Texas' established legal status as a state of the United States of America. These arguments are illustrated in legal actions brought by proponents of these viewpoints.

Colorado case

In January 2004, Timothy Paul Kootenay, in jail in Aspen, Colorado, claimed that the state of Colorado had no jurisdiction to extradite him to California on a probation warrant, on the grounds that he was a citizen of the Republic of Texas. He claimed that the sliver of land which contains Aspen was a part of the original Republic of Texas and, as such, he was not a citizen of the United States. His claim was rejected by the courts.

Richard McLaren: Petition to the International Court of Justice and in U.S. District Court

In 1995, a petition was filed with the International Court of Justice in The Hague, The Netherlands, by Richard L. McLaren asking that the Republic of Texas be declared to still exist. The clerk at the International Court of Justice declined to file the case and replied 

 I have to inform you, however, that the function of the International Court of Justice is confined to the settling, in accordance with international law, of legal disputes submitted to it by States, and to the rendering of advisory opinions on legal questions referred to it by duly authorized international organs and agencies. It follows that neither the Court nor its Members can consider applications from private individuals, or other entities, or provide them with legal advice, or assist them in their relations with the authorities in any country. As a result, no action will be taken on your letter.  
 
A descriptive handbook published in 2004 by the International Court of Justice states that "Only States may be parties to cases before the Court" and the Court will only decide disputes which are "submitted to it by States."

Regarding these types of petitions, the International Court of Justice handbook states:

Hardly a day passes without the Registry receiving written or oral applications from private persons. However heart-rending, however well-founded, such applications may be, the ICJ is unable to entertain them and a standard reply is always sent: 'Under Article 34 of the Statute, only States may be parties in cases before the Court.'

McLaren was ultimately unsuccessful in his effort. He filed in the United States District Court for the District of Columbia, which stated in its decision on April 30, 1998, "Despite plaintiffs' argument ... [i]n 1845, Texas became the 28th state of the United States of America. The Republic of Texas no longer exists."

U.S. legislation

Joint Resolution for Annexing Texas to the United States, March 1, 1845
Presidential Proclamation Declaring a State of Peace Between Texas and the United States, August 20, 1866
An Act to admit the State of Texas to Representation in the Congress of the United States. March 30, 1870

See also
Alaskan Independence Party
Dominion of British West Florida (micronation)
Law of Texas
Legal status of Alaska
Legal status of Hawaii
Republic of Texas (group)
Texas in the American Civil War
Texas secession movements
Tribal sovereignty

Notes

External links

Republic of Texas independence movement websites
 Republic of Texas
 republic-of-texas.net
 texasrepublic.com
 Texas Secede!

Terrorism Knowledge Base profile of Republic of Texas
Republic of Texas (archived from the original on 2007-09-30)

Texas convention pro-continuation of 1861
 RoT statement to US District Court in Austin
 RoT declaration filed with the Swiss Federal Council
 RoT cease fire against the state government

Texas law
Politics of Texas